Broken Records was an American Christian rock record label founded in 1985. The label closed in the early 1990s.

Broken Records became an important label in the development of both the West Coast Christian alternative rock and Christian hip hop scenes. It focused primarily on modern rock, punk and new wave music.

Artists signed to Broken Records included: Level Heads, The Altar Boys, The Choir, Crumbächer, The 77s, 4-4-1, Riki Michele, Adam Again and Undercover. 

After having difficulties with its distributor, the label was for a time run successfully as Brainstorm Artists International (by Ojo Taylor and Gene Eugene).

Artists 
 4-4-1
 The 77s
 Adam Again
 The Altar Boys
 The Choir
 The Clergy (see also Yum Yum Children)
 Crumbächer
 J.C. and the Boyz
 Mercy
 Riki Michele
 S.F.C.
 Undercover
 Level Heads

References 

Record labels established in 1985
Record labels disestablished in 1991
American independent record labels
Christian record labels
1985 establishments in the United States